The United Arab Emirates employs minimum and maximum speed limits, which vary for different types of vehicles and roads. The roads are monitored by speed cameras to detect traffic violations such as speeding. Heavy vehicles such as trucks, mini buses and buses are installed with speed limiters to prevent overspeeding. Speed limits in the Emirate of Abu Dhabi are generally higher than the other Emirates. The general speed limit in Abu Dhabi is 140 km/h whereas in Dubai it is 110 km/h and in the Northern Emirates its 120km/h. Every Emirate with the exception of Abu Dhabi also has a speed buffer, allowing motorists to drive 20 km/h above the posted speed limit without any fines.

Speed limits

Light motor vehicle

References

United Arab Emirates
Transport in the United Arab Emirates